Butryny  is a village in the administrative district of Gmina Purda, within Olsztyn County, Warmian-Masurian Voivodeship, in northern Poland. It is located within the historic region of Warmia

The village has a population of 580.

The historic sights of Butryny include the Saint James' church, dating back to the 17th century, typical Warmian old wayside shrines and a Catholic cemetery.

The village was founded in 1412. Polish poet and bishop Ignacy Krasicki visited Butryny in 1767 and 1779.

Notable people
 (1886–1941), Polish officer, activist and mayor of Rzeszów, who died in the German Auschwitz concentration camp
Katarzyna Nowowiejska née Falk, mother of Polish composer Feliks Nowowiejski

Gallery

References

Butryny